A. Sarkunam is an Indian film director, working in the Tamil film industry. He worked as an associate with director A.L Vijay.

Career
Sarkunam made his directorial debut with the romantic comedy Kalavani (2009). Featuring Vimal and Oviya in the lead roles, the film released to positive critical response and went on to become a sleeper hit. His next film was the period piece Vaagai Sooda Vaa (2011) again starring Vimal which also received positive reviews. The film earned the prestigious National Film Award for Best Feature Film in Tamil. Sarkunam said that Vaagai Sooda Vaa was his first script and dream project. He then made a romantic comedy film titled Naiyaandi with Dhanush and Nazriya Nazim in the lead. 

In 2014, he started new production company "A Sarkunam Cinemaz" and introduced his brother A. Nandha Kumar as a producer. Their first production was  Manjapai, which marked the directorial debut of Sarkunam's former assistant N. Raghavan. His fourth film Chandi Veeran, produced by Bala and starring Atharvaa and Anandhi was released in 2015. This Film also got good reviews and it had many similarities with his first film Kalavani, produced by Bala and starring Atharvaa and Anandhi was released in 2015. This film also got good reviews and it had many similarities with his first film Kalavani.

Filmography

References

External links
 

Tamil film directors
Living people
1975 births
Tamil film producers
People from Thanjavur district
Tamil screenwriters
Film directors from Tamil Nadu
Film producers from Tamil Nadu
21st-century Indian film directors
Screenwriters from Tamil Nadu